Zanna Chase is an ocean-going professor of chemical oceanography and paleoceanography at the Institute of Marine and Antarctic Science, University of Tasmania, Australia. She has undertaken over 20 voyages on research vessels, and her areas of expertise are Antartic paleoclimate, marine carbon cycle, radionuclides in the ocean, sediment geochemistry, paleoceanography, and marine biogeochemistry. In 2013 she was awarded with an ARC Future Fellowship.

Education and career 
She completed her undergraduate studies in Mathematics and Biology at McGill University in Canada in 1993. She then completed her Master's degree in biological oceanography at McGill University in 1996 working on how iron controls marine protozoans. She undertook her PhD in chemical oceanography and paleoceanography at Lamont–Doherty Earth Observatory where she worked on trace elements and primary production in marine ecosystems. Prior to joining the newly formed Institute of Marine and Antarctic Science, University of Tasmania in 2010, she was on the faculty at Oregon State University. The main themes of her work have been focused in oceanography, glacial period, and phytoplankton.

Research 
Her research focusses on the interaction between chemical cycles and biological activity, the study of biogeochemistry. She is interested in how the biogeochemical changes in the Southern Ocean influence climate, and are also affected by climate, in the modern ocean. She also studies past biogeochemical changes in the ocean, the study of paleoceanography.  She has written 137 research works, and a significant focus of her work has been on understanding the role of iron as a micronutrient in the oceans. Another focus of her work is on the exchange of carbon dioxide between the oceans and the atmosphere and the role of carbon sequestration in the oceans on controlling natural climate changes over the glacial-interglacial cycles. She uses a range of geochemical proxies analysed on ocean waters and sediment cores including long-lived, naturally occurring radioisotopes like Thorium isotopes to reconstruct particle flux, and redox-sensitive metals such as Manganese and Uranium to reconstruct ocean oxygen levels. She is also involved in research to improve our understanding of trace metal proxies through participation in the international GEOTRACES program. She has participated in >20 voyages on a range of different research vessels including the Australian blue water vessel RV Investigator.

Selected publications

References

External links 
 

Living people
Academic staff of the University of Tasmania
Oregon State University faculty
Australian oceanographers
Women oceanographers
McGill University alumni
Year of birth missing (living people)